Black Gipsy is an album by jazz saxophonist Archie Shepp recorded in Europe in 1969 for the America label. The album was also issued by the Prestige label under the title Black Gypsy.

Reception 
The Allmusic review by Sean Westergaard states: "This music gets intense, but melody is always at its core: this is not just a free blowing session. The rhythm section keeps things well grounded, aided greatly by Burrell's marvelous comping while the horns and harmonica take the melodies and run with them. Good stuff."

Track listing 
 "Black Gipsy" (Augustus Arnold, Lincoln T. Beauchamp Jr.) - 25:44
 "Epitaph of a Small Winner: Rio de Janeiro/Casablanca/Chicago" (Lincoln T. Beauchamp, jr., known as Chicago Beau, Julio Finn - 22:40
 "Pitchin' Can" (Cal Massey) - 7:35 Bonus track on CD
 Recorded in Paris, France, November 9, 1969

Personnel 
 Archie Shepp - soprano saxophone
 Clifford Thornton - trumpet
 Noah Howard - alto saxophone
 Julio Finn - harmonica
 Leroy Jenkins - viola
 Dave Burrell - piano
 Earl Freeman - bass
 Sunny Murray - drums
 Chicago Beau - vocals

References 

1970 albums
Archie Shepp albums
America Records albums